Eli Tsiyon ve-Areha is an acrostic Zionide of anonymous authorship, lamenting the destruction of Jerusalem and the Temple. It closes the series of kinnot chanted on the morning of Tisha B'Av by Ashkenazi communities.

The poem appears in manuscripts as early as the fourteenth century. Structural similarities to  suggest that it was composed by Judah Halevi or one of his imitators.

Eli Tsiyon ve-Areha is known for its distinctive melody, which likely originated in Southern Germany. It has been compared to medieval tunes for the Souterliedekens and the folk song "Die Frau zur Weissenburg". The melody has become symbolic of Tisha B'Av and the three weeks preceding it, and as such is traditionally also used during this period for the refrain to Lekha Dodi.

Text
The poem comprises twelve stanzas, each divided into four rhyming lines beginning alternately with ʿalei (for) and veʿal (and for). In the text below, the first Hebrew letter of each line is made bold as to indicate the alphabetical nature of the poem. The kinnas refrain is derived from a verse in the Book of Joel: "Lament like a maiden wrapped in sack-cloth for the husband of her youth."

Legacy

Various musical arrangements of the melody were also produced in the 20th century. These include a paraphrase for piano and cello by Leo Zeitlin and its adaptation for piano and violin by Joseph Achron, both members of the New Jewish School, which aimed to create a national Jewish art music.

External links
 Recordings of the hymn at the National Library of Israel
 Arrangement of Eli Tsiyon by Salomon Sulzer (1838)

References
 

Jewish liturgical poems
Tisha B'Av